East Village is an area in Downtown Kansas City, Missouri located northeast of City Hall and east of Ilus W. Davis Park. 

The area which is set around 11th & Locust will be the new headquarters for J.E. Dunn Construction Group and other Village East development like residences and commercial space.

References 
East Village backers seek a delay (July 1, 2009)

Neighborhoods in Kansas City, Missouri